Lucius Fulcinius Trio (died AD 35) was a Roman senator who came from a plebeian family. Trio was an active prosecutor (delator) during the reign of Tiberius who developed a reputation for making accusations. He was governor of Lusitania from about 21 to 31, before returning to Rome to hold the office of consul suffect with Publius Memmius Regulus in 31. His friendship with Sejanus would lead to allegations that ended with his suicide in early 35.

Background
Trio may have been from the Fulcinii, a plebeian family still active in politics during the Principate. His family had not yet achieved the rank of consul, he himself being honored with the rank of consul suffectus, which was generally reserved for novi homes. Rutledge reasons his family was therefore not likely of noble lineage.

He may have had a brother named Gaius Fulcinius Trio, attested as praetor peregrinus in 24.

Career
Trio's first recorded accusation was that against praetor Marcus Scribonius Libo and his brother Lucius Scribonius Libo, although Trio had already developed a reputation as a prosecutor (accusator; lit. "accuser"). Trio was an imitator of the aggressive oratory style of Cassius Severus.

Trio is first seen joining the prosecution against the Scribonii brothers in 16. Marcus Scribonius Libo and Lucius Scribonius Libo were accused of conspiring against the emperor. The other accusators were "new men" Firmius Catus, Fonteius Agrippa, and Vibius Serenus. Serenus headed the prosecution, with the rest as subscriptores. Libo killed himself on 13 September 16, before the trial could be completed. Libo's goods were divided among the prosecutors, and they were all (except Serenus) elevated to the rank of praetor (extra ordinem). This trial is the earliest example of Tiberius rewarding prosecutors with political advancement, which would become a recurring theme throughout his rule.

Trio is again an accuser in 20 CE in the trial against Gnaeus Calpurnius Piso, for which he received an imperial commendation. He worked alongside Servaeus, Veranius, and Vitellius to lay down the charges against Piso, which include: provincial mismanagement, tampering with the army in Syria, and the murder of Germanicus with poison. Trio prosecuted him for financial mismanagement, the least pressing of the charges. The prosecutors were all given priesthoods, except Trio, who was advised by Tiberius to tone down his antagonizing rhetoric, but was promised future political advancement in place of a priesthood. True to his word, Tiberius made him governor of Lusitania.

Governor of Lusitania
He was governor (legatus Augusti) of the province Lusitania for 10 years, from around 21 to 31 AD. During his time there a Lucius Cornelius Bocchus served as his praefectus fabrum (lit. "prefect of engineers"), but was effectively his chief administrative assistant. Trio had to promote the imperial cult and build the "Temple of the Deified Augustus" in the new forum of Augusta Emerita, a work that Bocchus would be in charge of.  He constructed the temple in the new forum using marble. The temple in the old forum was granite.

While still in Lusitania, on 21 January 31, Trio offered shared client status to several freemen of the Stertinia family. Their names were: Q. (Quintus) Stertinius Bassus, Q. Stertinius Rufus, and Lucius Stertinius Rufinus. Bassus was the father of Rufus and the grandfather of Rufinus.

Consul suffect
On 1 July 31, Trio became consul suffect, replacing his friend Sejanus in that role. Cassius Dio says the office was given to him by Sejanus. From 1 October he shared the consulship with Publius Memmius Regulus, only 17 days before the fall of Sejanus on 18 October. Regulus took the lead in removing Sejanus. Tiberius did not trust Trio with any role in the overthrow.

The fall of Sejanus was not good for Trio. He had made many enemies in the Roman elite. The families of those he had previously accused, Libo and Piso, were friends of each other with many connections in the senate. He clung to his position and took a lead in the executions of those accused of conspiring with Sejanus, but it did no good; he was accused of being a follower of Sejanus. Trio accused Regulus of slacking in his investigations against Sejanus' alleged plot. Their accusations against each other went nowhere thanks to the intervention of other senators.

Downfall
In AD 32 Decimus Haterius Agrippa attacked both Regulus and Trio to better his political position. The Senate again put a stop it. Quintus Sanquinius Maximus had Trio's trial postponed as to not give anxiety to the emperor. "This secured the safety of Regulus and the postponement of Trio's ruin" according to Tacitus. Haterius Agrippa wasn't popular and Cassius Dio says Tiberius was still grateful for Trio's performance in prosecuting Libo.

In 35, Trio was accused and thrown in prison as a friend of Sejanus and for allegedly supporting his cause. He would have been brought to trial if he had not taken his own life first. He left a will insulting Tiberius and Macro which his sons tried to suppress, but the emperor had made public in a display of tolerance of free speech in others.

Inscriptions

References

Sources
 
 
 
 
 
  
 
 

Suffect consuls of Imperial Rome
1st-century BC Romans
1st-century Romans
35 deaths
Year of birth unknown
Ancient Romans who committed suicide